Mohamed Djaanfari (born 1952) is a politician in The Comoros. He is a retired French air force officer, local transportation tycoon and Vice-President of the Assembly of the Union of the Comoros. He contested the 2006 presidential elections and ended up losing badly to Ahmed Abdallah Mohamed Sambi. He received only 13.65% of the national vote on 14 May 2006, compared to Sambi's 58.02%.

Djaanfari is a deputy in the Assembly from Sima. He was a candidate in the June 2008 presidential election on Anjouan, losing to Moussa Toybou in a second round of voting. He received 47.58% of the vote against 52.42% for Toybou.

References 

Members of the Assembly of the Union of the Comoros
Living people
Comorian military personnel
Candidates for President of the Comoros
1952 births
People from Anjouan